NEAR or Near

People 
 Thomas J. Near, US evolutionary ichthyologist
 Near, a developer who created the higan emulator

Science, mathematics, technology, biology, and medicine 
 National Emergency Alarm Repeater (NEAR), a former alarm device to warn civilians of a foreign nuclear attack on the United States
 National Emergency Airway Registry (NEAR), a patient registry for intubations in the United States
 Nicking enzyme amplification reaction (NEAR), a method of DNA amplification
 NEAR Shoemaker, a spacecraft that studied the near-Earth asteroid Eros
 Nearness or proximity space
"Near", a city browser by NearGlobal

Television, film, music, and books 
 Near (Death Note), Nate River, a character

Other uses 
 Near v. Minnesota, a U.S. press freedom Supreme Court decision
 New England Auto Racers Hall of Fame